The 2002–03 season was RC Lens's 97th season in existence and the club's 12th consecutive season in the top flight of French football. In addition to the domestic league, Lens participated in this season's editions of the Coupe de France and the Coupe de la Ligue.

First-team squad
Squad at end of season

Competitions

Overview

Ligue 1

League table

Results summary

Results by round

Matches

Coupe de France

Coupe de la Ligue

Champions League

First group stage

UEFA Cup

Third round

References

RC Lens seasons
Lens